The 2009–10 Spanish stage of the UEFA Regions' Cup was the sixth edition of this tournament. Organised by the Royal Spanish Football Federation, the winner qualified for the 2011 UEFA Regions' Cup.

Squads

Each region had to submit a squad of 18 players.

First round

Group A

Group B

Group C

Group D

Group E

Play-off

Semi-finals

Final

Scorers
3 goals
  Gustavo (1 in play-off)

2 goals
  Asier Butrón  
  Joaquin Moya

1 goal
  Gordi
  Pibe
  Charly
  Jon Carrera
  Jaime Rayo
  Nadal
  Roberto Yanes
  Alberto Mato
  Francis
  Anxo Mato
  Diego Otero
  David Pérez
  Javier Álvarez 
  Mouriño (in semifinals)
  César Otero (in the final)
  Felipe (in the final)
  Alberto Sáez
  Bretón
  Daniel Avalos
  José Antonio Gasch

Notes

External links
 2009-10 RFEF Competition rules PDF

Spanish stage of the UEFA Regions' Cup
UEFA Regions' Cup
2009–10 in Spanish football cups